Ross Murray (born 1 January 1982) is a Scottish professional boxer who challenged for the Commonwealth flyweight title in 2018.

Professional career
Murray made his professional debut on 25 June 2016, scoring a four-round points decision (PTS) victory over Sergey Tasimov at the Bellahouston Leisure Centre in Glasgow, Scotland.

Professional boxing record

References

Living people
1982 births
Scottish male boxers
Boxers from Glasgow
Light-flyweight boxers
Flyweight boxers
Super-flyweight boxers